Preputial glands are exocrine glands that are located in the folds of skin front of the genitals of some mammals.  They occur in several species, including mice, ferrets, rhinoceroses, and even-toed ungulates and produce pheromones. The glands play a role in the urine-marking behavior of canids such as gray wolves and African wild dogs. The preputial glands of female animals are sometimes called clitoral glands.

The preputial glands of male musk deer produce strong-smelling deer musk which is of economic importance, as it is used in perfumes.

Human homologues

There is debate about whether humans have functional homologues to preputial glands. Preputial glands were first noted by Edward Tyson and in 1694 fully described by William Cowper who named them Tyson's glands after Tyson. They are described as modified sebaceous glands located around the corona and inner surface of the prepuce of the human penis. They are believed to be most frequently found in the balanopreputial sulcus. Their secretion may be one of the components of smegma.

Some, including Satya Parkash, dispute their existence. While humans may not have true anatomical equivalents, the term may sometimes be used for tiny whitish yellow bumps occasionally found on the corona of the glans penis. The proper name for these structures is pearly penile papules (or hirsutoid papillomas). According to detractors, they are not glands, but mere thickenings of the skin and are not involved in the formation of smegma.

See also 
 List of specialized glands within the human integumentary system

References 

Sexual anatomy
Glands